The Pakistan U-17 women's national football team is a youth women's football team operated under the Pakistan Football Federation. The team has so far represented Pakistan at the AFC U-17 Women's Championship and the SAFF U-15 Women's Championship.

Team image

Nicknames
The Pakistan women's national under-17 football team has been known or nicknamed as the Green Shirts, Pak Shaheens.

Home stadium
Bolivia plays their home matches on the Karachi United Stadium and others stadiums.

History
The Pakistan womens national under-17 football team is the very weakest womens soccer team alongside Bhutan and Sri Lanka in the SAFF region. They team have played their debut game on 9 August 2018 at Thimphu, Bhutan versus Bangladesh which lost by 0–14 goals. The nations are not regularly participating in their SAFF and AFC competitions. They yet to qualified AFC U-17 Women's Asian Cup.

Current squad
The following squad was announced for 2019 AFC U-16 Women's Championship qualification

Fixtures and results 
Legend

2018

2019

Competitive record 
 Champions   Runners-up   Third place   Fourth place

FIFA U-17 Women's World Cup 

*Draws include knockout matches decided on penalty kicks.

AFC U-17 Women's Asian Cup 

*Draws include knockout matches decided on penalty kicks.

AFC U-17 Women's Asian Cup qualification 

*Draws include knockout matches decided on penalty kicks.

SAFF U-15 Championship

References

Asian women's national under-17 association football teams
under-17